Falcon School District 49 (D49) is a public school district located on 133 square miles in the shadow of Pikes Peak. It spans from eastern Colorado Springs and several unincorporated areas of El Paso County.

List of schools

Elementary schools
Bennett Ranch Elementary School
Evans International Elementary School
Falcon Elementary School of Technology
Meridian Ranch Elementary School
Odyssey Elementary School
Remington Elementary School
Ridgeview Elementary School
Springs Ranch Elementary School
Stetson Elementary School
Woodmen Hills Elementary School
Inspiration View Elementary School

Middle schools
Falcon Middle School
Horizon Middle School
Skyview Middle School

High schools
Falcon High School
Sand Creek High School
Vista Ridge High School

Alternative schools
Academy for Literacy, Learning & Innovation Excellence
Patriot High School
Pikes Peak Early College
Springs Studio for Academic Excellence

Charter schools
Banning Lewis Ranch Academy
GOAL Academy
Liberty Tree Academy
Pikes Peak School Expeditionary Learning
Power Technical Early College
Rocky Mountain Classical Academy

See also
List of school districts in Colorado

References

External links

School districts in Colorado
Education in El Paso County, Colorado